Wilder Homestead, also known as the Boyhood Home of Almanzo Wilder, is a historic home and farmstead in Burke in Franklin County, New York. Wilder was a farmer who married author Laura Ingalls Wilder. The farmhouse was built in 1843, and is a two-story, Greek Revival style frame dwelling. The front facade features a small porch supported by square columns. It has a -story rear block with a small colonnaded portico. The property includes eight reconstructed outbuildings including a visitor's center (1989), corn crib (1989), three barns (1995, 1997, 1999), picnic pavilion (1998), rest rooms (1999), and pump house (2002). The Wilder family occupied the property until about 1875. The property is operated by the Almanzo & Laura Ingalls Wilder Association as an interactive educational center, museum and working farm as in the time of Almanzo Wilder's childhood as depicted in the Laura Ingalls Wilder book Farmer Boy.

It was listed on the National Register of Historic Places in 2014.

References

External links
 Wilder Homestead - official site

Wilder family
History museums in New York (state)
Houses on the National Register of Historic Places in New York (state)
Greek Revival architecture in New York (state)
Houses completed in 1843
Houses in Franklin County, New York
Museums in Franklin County, New York
National Register of Historic Places in Franklin County, New York
1843 establishments in New York (state)